Halgerda graphica is a species of sea slug, a dorid nudibranch, shell-less marine gastropod mollusks in the family Discodorididae.

Distribution
This species was described from Kangaroo Island, South Australia. It has also been reported from nearby Port Moorowie on the Yorke Peninsula and Burrewarra Point, near Batemans Bay, New South Wales.

References

Discodorididae
Gastropods described in 1905